Roman Rishatovich Safiullin (born 7 August 1997) is a Russian professional tennis player. Safiullin is a junior major champion, having won the 2015 Australian Open over Hong Seong-chan. Safiullin has a career high ATP singles ranking of world No. 82 achieved on 6 February 2023, and doubles of world No. 239 achieved on 7 February 2022.

Career
Safiullin was born in Podolsk, Russia, to a Tatar father and Russian mother.

On the junior tour, Safiullin has a career high combined ranking of No. 2 achieved on 26 May 2014. His biggest junior title, after his Australian Open title, is the Grade A Trofeo Bonfiglio where he beat Andrey Rublev in the final.

2020: Maiden Challenger titles in singles and doubles 
Safiullin claimed his maiden challenger tour titles in singles and doubles with Pavel Kotov in Cherbourg, France in February 2020.

2021: Grand Slam debut
He made his Grand Slam debut at the 2021 Australian Open where he reached the second round by defeating Ilya Ivashka. He also qualified for the 2021 French Open reaching also the second round with a win over Carlos Taberner.  As a result he reached a career-high singles ranking of No. 156 on 14 June 2021.

2022: ATP Cup & semifinals, first ATP semifinal & top 10 win, top 100 
On his debut, he reached the semifinals at the 2022 ATP Cup after winning 2 singles and 3 doubles matches with teammate Daniil Medvedev. As a result he moved 21 positions up in the rankings to a new career-high in the top 150 in singles of World No. 146 on 10 January 2022.

At the 2022 Australian Open, he qualified as lucky loser after the withdrawal of Casper Ruud where he lost to Alex Molčan.

Safiullin qualified for Marseilles after beating Ernests Gulbis and Julian Lenz. After qualifying, he beat 7th seed Alexei Popyrin and fellow qualifier Tomáš Macháč to reach his first ATP Tour-level quarterfinal. There, he claimed his first top-10 win by beating top seed Stefanos Tsitsipas in straight sets, for the best win in his career, to reach his first semifinal on the ATP Tour. He lost to Felix Auger-Aliassime in straight sets with two tiebreaks.

In July, he won his second Challenger title in Nur Sultan. As a result, he reached a new career-high ranking in the top 120 at world No. 119. He then won a third Challenger title in Chicago, propelling him 25 positions up to a top 100 debut at world No. 97 on 15 August 2022.

In September, Safiullin reached the second semifinal of the season in Tel Aviv, where he lost in straight sets to top seed Novak Djokovic. As a result he reached a new career-high ranking of world No. 92 on 3 October 2022.

2023: Fourth Challenger title and new career high ranking
He reached a new career-high ranking of No. 82 on 6 February 2023 after he clinched his first ATP Challenger Tour title of the year at the 2023 Koblenz Open. He won four three-set matches before he defeating Vasek Pospisil in the final.

Grand Slam singles performance timeline

Junior Grand Slam finals

Singles: 1 (1 title)

Other finals

Challenger and Futures/World Tennis tour finals

Singles: 29 (23 titles, 6 runner-ups)

Doubles: 11 (4 titles, 7 runners-up)

Record against other players

Record against top 10 players
Safiullin's record against players who have been ranked in the top 10, with those who are active in boldface. Only ATP Tour main draw matches are considered:

Wins over top 10 players
He has a  record against players who were, at the time the match was played, ranked in the top 10.

*

Awards
 The Russian Cup in the nominations:
 Team of the Year — Boys Under-16: 2013.
Junior of the Year: 2015.

Notes

References

External links
 
 

1997 births
Living people
Russian male tennis players
People from Podolsk
Australian Open (tennis) junior champions
Universiade medalists in tennis
Universiade bronze medalists for Russia
Grand Slam (tennis) champions in boys' singles
Medalists at the 2017 Summer Universiade
Sportspeople from Moscow Oblast
Tatar people of Russia
Tatar sportspeople